The Masquerader is a 1922 American silent drama film directed by James Young and starring Guy Bates Post, Ruth Cummings, and Edward Kimball. A jaded British politician arranges for his place to be taken by his doppelganger cousin. The film was based on the 1904 novel The Masquerader by Katherine Cecil Thurston. It was remade in 1933 with Ronald Colman in the lead roles. This film is now considered lost

Cast
 Guy Bates Post as John Chilcote M.P. / John Loder  
 Ruth Cummings as Eve Chilcote  
 Edward Kimball as Brock  
 Herbert Standing as Herbert Fraide  
 Lawson Butt as Mr. Lakely  
 Marcia Manon as Lady Lillian Astrupp  
 Barbara Tennant as Bobby Blessington

References

Bibliography
 Goble, Alan. The Complete Index to Literary Sources in Film. Walter de Gruyter, 1999.

External links

1922 films
1922 drama films
Silent American drama films
Films directed by James Young
1920s English-language films
American black-and-white films
Films set in London
Films based on British novels
American silent feature films
1920s American films